Tai Koo Shing Ferry Pier (1980 - 1983) was a small-sized barge pier in Tai Koo Shing, Quarry Bay, Hong Kong. Its location is now near Poyang Mansion, Tsui Woo Terrance. The pier was opened in 1980 to relieve traffic congestion problems in King's Road. The Hong Kong and Yaumati Ferry Company provided ferry services to Central and Kowloon City from there. It was closed when the Sai Wan Ho Ferry Pier in Sai Wan Ho started operation in 1983.

References

Demolished piers in Hong Kong
Quarry Bay
Victoria Harbour
Buildings and structures completed in 1980
1983 disestablishments in Hong Kong
1980 establishments in Hong Kong